George Arthur Pollard (1863–1939) was a New Zealand salvation army officer and administrator. He was born in Heckmondwike, Yorkshire, England in 1863.

References

1863 births
1939 deaths
People from Heckmondwike
New Zealand Salvationists
English emigrants to New Zealand